Myoxanthus fimbriatus is a species of orchid that occurs from southeastern Ecuador to northern Peru.

References

External links 

fimbriatus
Orchids of Ecuador
Orchids of Peru